Indian National Defence Workers Federation (INDWF) is a trade union in India, affiliated to the Indian National Trade Union Congress, that organizes civilian workers in factories and other establishments under the Ministry of Defence. INDWF opposes privatization of Defence units and ordnance factories.

Trade unions in India
Indian National Trade Union Congress
Trade unions in Indian Defence
Defence and munitions trade unions